Dyckman Street station may refer to:
 Dyckman Street station (IRT Broadway–Seventh Avenue Line)
 Dyckman Street station (IND Eighth Avenue Line)